Ulisses Indalécio Silva Antunes, nicknamed Lúcio Antunes, is Cape Verdean football manager.

He was appointed the manager of the Cape Verde national team in July 2010. He led the Cape Verde national side to the 2013 African Cup of Nations for the first time in their history, but had to take a leave from his day job as an air-traffic controller. 

In late November 2013, he left Cape Verde to take charge of Angolan side Progresso do Sambizanga.  

In September 2016, he was reappointed as the manager of Cape Verde's national team.

Achievements
As manager
Lusophony Games winner: 2009
Sal Football Championships winner: 2015-16

References

Living people
1966 births
Cape Verdean football managers
Cape Verde national football team managers
Expatriate football managers in Angola
Air traffic controllers
Sportspeople from Praia
2013 Africa Cup of Nations managers